On 1 January 2007, Bulgaria and Romania became member states of the European Union (EU) in the fifth wave of EU enlargement.

Negotiations
Romania was the first country of post-communist Europe to have official relations with the European Community. In 1974, a treaty included Romania in the Community's Generalized System of Preferences. After the Romanian Revolution of 1989, membership of the EC, and its successor the European Union (EU), had been the main goal of every Romanian Government and practically every political party in Romania. Romania signed its Europe Agreement in 1993, and submitted its official application for membership in the EU on 22 June 1995 and Bulgaria submitted its official application for membership in the EU on 14 December 1995, the third and the fourth of the post–communist European countries to do so after Hungary and Poland. Along with its official EU application, Romania submitted the Snagov Declaration, signed by all fourteen major political parties declaring their full support for EU membership.

During the 2000s, Bulgaria and Romania implemented a number of reforms to prepare for EU accession, including the consolidation of its democratic systems, the institution of the rule of law, the acknowledgement of respect for human rights, the commitment to personal freedom of expression, and the implementation of a functioning free-market economy. The objective of joining the EU also influenced Bulgaria and Romania's regional relations. As a result, Bulgaria and Romania imposed visa regimes on a number of states, including Russia, Ukraine, Belarus, Serbia, Montenegro, Turkey and Moldova.

Within the framework of integration meetings held between the EU member states and the EU candidate states Bulgaria and Romania, an 'Association Committee' was held on 22 June 2004. It confirmed overall good progress for the preparation of accession; however, it highlighted the need for further reform of judicial structures in both Bulgaria and Romania, particularly in its pre-trial phases, as well as the need for further efforts to fight against political corruption and organized crime, including human trafficking. The findings were reflected in the 2004 Regular Report for Bulgaria and Romania.

The Brussels European Council of 17 December 2004 confirmed the conclusion of accession negotiations with Bulgaria and Romania. The 26 September 2006 of the European Commission confirmed the date once more, also announcing that Bulgaria and Romania would meet no direct restrictions, but progress in certain areas – reforms of the judicial system, elimination of corruption and the struggle against organized crime — would be strictly monitored.

Cyrillic

With this accession, Cyrillic became the third official alphabet of the EU, after the Latin and Greek alphabets. Cyrillic will also be featured on the euro banknotes and the national (obverse) side of the Bulgarian euro coins. The ECB and the EU Commission insisted that Bulgaria change the official name of the currency from ЕВРО (EVRO) (as accepted) to ЕУРО (EURO), claiming that the currency should have a standard spelling and pronunciation across the EU. For details, see Linguistic issues concerning the euro. The issue was decisively resolved in favour of Bulgaria at the 2007 EU Summit in Lisbon, allowing Bulgaria to use the Cyrillic spelling евро on all official EU documents.

Treaty

The date of accession, 1 January 2007, was set at the Thessaloniki Summit in 2003 and confirmed in Brussels on 18 June 2004. Bulgaria, Romania and the EU-25 signed the Treaty of Accession on 25 April 2005 at Luxembourg's Neumuenster Abbey.

The 26 September 2006 monitoring report of the European Commission confirmed the entry date as 1 January 2007. The last instrument of ratification of the Treaty of Accession was deposited with the Italian government on 20 December 2006 thereby ensuring it came into force on 1 January 2007.

Work restrictions

Some member states of the EU required Bulgarians and Romanians to acquire a permit to work, whilst members of all other old member states did not require one. In the Treaty of Accession 2005, there was a clause about a transition period so each old EU member state could impose such 2+3+2 transitional periods. Restrictions were planned to remain in place until 1 January 2014 – 7 years after their accession.

Remaining areas of inclusion
Bulgaria and Romania became members on 1 January 2007, but some areas of cooperation in the European Union will apply to Bulgaria and Romania at a later date. These are:

Schengen Area (see Enlargement of the Schengen Area)
Eurozone (see Enlargement of the eurozone)

Monitoring
While both countries were admitted, concerns about corruption and organised crime were still high. As a result, although they joined, they were subject to monitoring from the European Commission through a Mechanism for Cooperation and Verification (CVM). It was initially set up for three years after the accession but has continued indefinitely and although it has highlighted the corruption and applied some pressure to continue reforms, it has not succeeded in forcing the two countries to complete reforms and corruption persists. In 2019 however, the European Commission stated that it will admit Bulgaria in the Schengen area for its efforts against corruption.

Commissioners

The accession treaty granted Bulgaria and Romania a seat, like every other state, on the Commission. Bulgaria nominated Meglena Kuneva, from NDSV who was given the post of Commissioner for Consumer Protection in the Barroso Commission, from 1 January 2007 until 31 October 2009. She was nominated in 2006 by the then current Bulgarian Prime Minister Sergei Stanishev. Romania nominated Leonard Orban, an independent, who was made Commissioner for Multilingualism in the Barroso Commission, from 1 January 2007 until 31 October 2009. He was nominated in 2006 by the previous Romanian Prime Minister Călin Popescu-Tăriceanu. Both were approved by Parliament to become Commissioners upon accession.

MEPs

Upon accession Bulgaria's 18 and Romania's 35 observer MEPs became full voting representatives until each state held an election for the posts, which were mandated to happen before the end of the year. Bulgaria held its election on 20 May 2007 and Romania on 25 November 2007.

Impact

See also
 Bulgaria and the euro
 Romania and the euro
 1973 enlargement of the European Communities
 1981 enlargement of the European Communities
 1986 enlargement of the European Communities
 1995 enlargement of the European Union
 2004 enlargement of the European Union
 2013 enlargement of the European Union
 Romanian withdrawal from the European Union

References

Historical enlargements of the European Union
History of the European Union
Enlargement of the European Union, 2007
Enlargement of the European Union, 2007
Enlargement of the European Union, 2007
Enlargement of the European Union